Chamaesphecia astatiformis is a moth of the family Sesiidae. It is found from the Czech Republic, Austria, Slovenia and the Balkan Peninsula, east to Russia, northern Turkey, Kazakhstan, the Altai and Uzbekistan.

The wingspan is about 17 mm.

The larvae feed on Euphorbia esula and Euphorbia salicifolia.

References

Moths described in 1846
Sesiidae
Moths of Europe
Moths of Africa